Drum Hill High School, which was readapted for use as Drum Hill Senior Living Community, is a historic school located at Peekskill, Westchester County, New York, United States. It was built between 1909 and 1911 and is a three-story, "E"-shaped, gray buff pressed brick building in the Classical Revival style. It features an elaborate light court.  It remained in use as a school until 1972.  It was later developed into a senior living community.

It was added to the National Register of Historic Places in 1979.

References

External links
Drum Hill Senior Living Community website

School buildings on the National Register of Historic Places in New York (state)
Neoclassical architecture in New York (state)
School buildings completed in 1909
Schools in Westchester County, New York
Buildings and structures in Peekskill, New York
National Register of Historic Places in Westchester County, New York
1909 establishments in New York (state)